Bubbly Creek is the nickname given to the South Fork of the South Branch of the Chicago River.  It runs entirely within the city of Chicago, Illinois, United States. It marks the boundary between the Bridgeport and McKinley Park community areas of the city. The creek derives its name from the gases bubbling out of the riverbed from the decomposition of blood and entrails dumped into the river in the early 20th century by the local meatpacking businesses surrounding the Union Stock Yards directly south of the creek's endpoint at Pershing Road. It was brought to notoriety by Upton Sinclair in his exposé on the American meat packing industry titled The Jungle.

Bubbly Creek originates near 38th Street, at the Racine Avenue Pump Station of the Metropolitan Water Reclamation District of Greater Chicago.

History

The area surrounding Bubbly Creek was originally a wetland; during the 19th century, channels were dredged to increase the rate of flow into the Chicago River and dry out the area to increase the amount of habitable land in the fast-growing city. The South Fork became an open sewer for the local stockyards, especially the Union Stock Yards. Meatpackers dumped waste, such as blood and entrails, into the nearest river.  The creek received so much blood and offal that it began to bubble methane and hydrogen sulfide gas from the products of decomposition.

In 1906, author Upton Sinclair wrote The Jungle, a portrait of America's meat packing industry. In it, he reported on the state of Bubbly Creek, writing that:

Present situation

Two heavily polluted streams that joined to create the South Fork were later filled in, but their courses can still be seen today in the configuration of streets and railroad tracks in the area.

The area has been increasingly occupied by residential development such as Bridgeport Village; a program to oxygenate the creek by continuously injecting compressed air into the water has met with limited success, although the creek's odor has been much reduced.

Some fish and vegetation have returned in recent decades.

Areas near the creek have been designated for recreational uses including parks, and developers and the city agreed on a  setback to allow for remediation. However, during heavy rains, millions of gallons of wastewater continue to be dumped into the stagnant creek by the Metropolitan Water Reclamation District of Greater Chicago.

, the City of Chicago and the Army Corps of Engineers were considering a $2.65 million feasibility study to look at restoration options, which would have implications for the remainder of the Chicago River system due to the unusual challenges of Bubbly Creek. The creek's waters are largely stagnant, having little gravitational flow; the study investigated several possibilities, including a meandering stream amid a wetland, to restore an oxygenated system. The U.S. Army Corps of Engineers had proposed restoring about 44 acres of water and surrounding land, in part by covering the creek bottom with 6 inches of sand and 6 inches of rocks. The actual renovation project was expected to cost $15.4 million. In 2015, the project was stalled, due to contamination discovered in the creek's sediments.

A private society has opened the Chicago Maritime Museum, a museum and memorialization of Chicago's river and maritime heritage, on 35th Street adjacent to Bubbly Creek.

References

External links
Archived page for the Bubbly Creek Proposed Restoration

Bridgeport, Chicago
History of Chicago
Geography of Chicago
Lower West Side, Chicago
McKinley Park, Chicago
Rivers of Illinois
Rivers of Cook County, Illinois